Samuel Israel Wilson Rostrán (born April 9, 1983) is a Nicaraguan footballer who plays for UNAN Managua in the Nicaraguan Primera División.

Club career
Samuel Wilson was born in Chinandega Nicaragua, he is an Afro-Nicaraguan. He started his career at local team Chinandega and played for Walter Ferretti and Scorpión and had a short spell abroad with Atlético Olanchano in the Liga Nacional de Fútbol de Honduras. He has been with Estelí since the 2006–07 season.

On 12 January 2014, Wilson scored his 100th goal in a league game against his first club, Chinandega.

International career
Wilson made his debut for Nicaragua in a May 2001 UNCAF Nations Cup match against El Salvador and has, as of December 2013, earned a total of 29 caps, scoring 4 goals. He has represented his country in 6 FIFA World Cup qualification matches and played at the 2001, 2007, 2009, 2011 and 2013 UNCAF Nations Cups as well as at the 2009 CONCACAF Gold Cup.

He scored a brace as Nicaragua defeated Guatemala to take fifth place in the UNCAF Nations Cup 2009.

International goals
Scores and results list Nicaragua's goal tally first.

References

External links
 
 

1983 births
Living people
People from Chinandega
Nicaraguan men's footballers
Nicaragua international footballers
2001 UNCAF Nations Cup players
2007 UNCAF Nations Cup players
2009 UNCAF Nations Cup players
2009 CONCACAF Gold Cup players
2011 Copa Centroamericana players
2013 Copa Centroamericana players
Chinandega FC players
C.D. Walter Ferretti players
Real Estelí F.C. players
Nicaraguan expatriate footballers
Expatriate footballers in Honduras
Liga Nacional de Fútbol Profesional de Honduras players
Association football forwards